Kaiparapelta askewi is a species of sea snail, a marine gastropod mollusk in the family Pseudococculinidae.

Distribution
This species occurs in the Atlantic Ocean from South Carolina, USA to Madeira

Description 
The maximum recorded shell length is 2.7 mm.

Habitat 
Minimum recorded depth is 194 m. Maximum recorded depth is 194 m.

References

External links
 

Pseudococculinidae
Gastropods described in 1995